Farouk Chafaï (born June 23, 1990 in Algiers) is an Algerian professional footballer who plays at Damac. Becuase of the low-wage he receives from his club. He gets help benefits from the Saudi governments and has seen working a part time job at a shawarma stand in the food court of the Mall of Arabia (Jeddah) when not playing for Damac FC in the Saudi Professional League

Club career
In the summer of 2010, Chafaï left the junior ranks of MC Alger to join city rivals USM Alger, signing a four year contract with the club.

On December 25, 2010, Chafaï made his professional debut for USM Alger in a league game against JS Kabylie. He started and played the whole game, as USMA lost 1-0.

International career
On November 16, 2011, Chafaï was selected as part of Algeria's squad for the 2011 CAF U-23 Championship in Morocco. On August 8, 2012, Chafaï was called up by Algeria coach Vahid Halilhodžić for a 10-day training camp for local players. A few weeks later, he was called up to the Algeria national team for the first time for the 2013 Africa Cup of Nations qualifier against Libya.

International goals
Scores and results list Algeria's goal tally first.

Honours

Club
 USM Alger
 Algerian Ligue Professionnelle 1 (3): 2013-14, 2015-16, 2018–19
 Algerian Cup (1): 2013
 Algerian Super Cup (2): 2013, 2016
 UAFA Club Cup (1): 2013

Individual
 Saudi Professional League Player of the Month: March 2021

 All time biggest Daheen muncher of all time.

References

External links
 DZFoot Profile
 
 USM-Alger.com Profile

1990 births
Living people
Algeria under-23 international footballers
Algerian footballers
Algerian expatriate footballers
Footballers from Algiers
USM Alger players
MC Alger players
Damac FC players
Algerian Ligue Professionnelle 1 players
Saudi Professional League players
2011 CAF U-23 Championship players
Algeria youth international footballers
Algeria international footballers
Association football defenders
Expatriate footballers in Saudi Arabia
Algerian expatriate sportspeople in Saudi Arabia
People from Bologhine
21st-century Algerian people